Alan Bishop may refer to:

 Alan Bishop, American musician
 Alan R. Bishop, British physicist and academic
 Alan W. Bishop (1920–1988), British geotechnical engineer and academic
 T. A. M. Bishop (Terence Alan Martyn Bishop; 1907–1994), British palaeographer and historian